Anvers Island or Antwerp Island or Antwerpen Island or Isla Amberes is a high, mountainous island  long, the largest in the Palmer Archipelago of Antarctica. It was discovered by John Biscoe in 1832 and named in 1898 by the Belgian Antarctic Expedition under Adrien de Gerlache after the province of Antwerp in Belgium. It lies south-west of Brabant Island at the south-western end of the group. The south-western coastline of the island forms part of the Southwest Anvers Island and Palmer Basin Antarctic Specially Managed Area (ASMA 7). Cormorant Island, an Important Bird Area, lies 1 km off the south coast.

Palmer Station 

Construction finished in 1968. Around 50 people can inhabit Palmer Station at one time. The station is named for Nathaniel B. Palmer, likely to have been one of the first three persons to see Antarctica. There are science labs in the station, as well as a dock.

The former station of the British Antarctic Survey 
On Anvers Island, the British Antarctic Survey built and operated a station (Base N) for the purpose of survey and geology. It consisted of a hut and was occupied from February 27, 1955, until January 10, 1958. In 1958, the station was closed when local work was completed. Its hut was loaned to the U.S. Government on July 2, 1963, which converted it into a biological laboratory in January 1965 for use by American scientists at the nearby Palmer Station. The British station was open in support of an air facility from 1969 until 1971. It was destroyed by fire on December 28, 1971, while being renovated by the British Antarctic Survey. Debris was removed by the members of the US Antarctic Program in 1990/1991. Only concrete foundations remain.

A skiway was in use from 1969 to 1973. The air operations were transferred to Adelaide (Station T) in 1973 when the skiway deteriorated. The skiway remained intermittently in use until November 15, 1993.

Ship aground 
On 11 February 1972 the Lindblad Explorer ran aground near La Plaza Point, Antarctica. She was towed to Buenos Aires, Argentina and then to Kristiansand, Norway for repairs.

On 28 January 1989 the ARA Bahía Paraíso sank off Palmer  Station and Anvers.

D'Abnour Bay 
First charted by the French Antarctic Expedition (1903–05) under J.B. Charcot, who named the bay for French naval officer Contre-amiral Richard d'Abnour.

Geology
The Anvers-Melchior Islands Tectonic Block includes the northwest portion of Anvers Island and the Melchior Islands offshore.  The block is bounded on the southeast by the SW-NE trending strike-slip Fournier Fault.  The block is composed of a volcanic suite which may correspond to the Antarctic Peninsula Volcanic Group.  Granite, diorite, and tonalite plutons indicate three phases of intrusion dated at 68-54 Ma, 34 Ma, and 21-20 Ma.  Two distinct systems of dykes are present, possibly of Tertiary age.  The southeast portion of Anvers Island is part of the Neumayer Channel Tectonic Block.

Cultural references
Anvers Island was the scene of the protagonist Grim Fiddle's "kingdom" and his later imprisonment in John Calvin Batchelor's novel The Birth of the People's Republic of Antarctica. Fiddle was an adventurer in a dystopian future world with many references to Norse mythology.

Features 
 Félicie Point, forms the south end of Lion Island, lying immediately east of Anvers Island
 Hippolyte Point, marks the northeast end of Lion Island, lying immediately east of Anvers Island
 Lion Sound, a small passage between Lion Island and the southeast coast of Anvers Island
 Zeus Ridge, a heavily crevassed ridge in central Anvers Island

See also

Further reading 
 ARTHUR S. RUNDLE, Snow accumulation and ice movement on the Anvers Island ice cap, Antarctica : a study of mass balance, Institute of Polar Studies, The Ohio State University, Columbus, Ohio

References

External links 

 Anvers Island on summitpost website
 updated long term weather for Anvers Island
 weather statistics for Anvers Island
 
 Anvers Island on the Palmer Station LocalWiki

 
Islands of the Palmer Archipelago